Lee Da-hye (born October 27, 1985) is a South Korean professional Go player. In 2006, she became as the runner-up of Female Myungin. She was a cast member in the reality show The Genius: Rule Breaker.

References

External links
 Korea Baduk Association profile (in Korean)

1985 births
Living people
South Korean Go players
Female Go players
Hankuk University of Foreign Studies alumni